Phil Morwood born (17 June 1982) in Toowoomba, Queensland, Australia is a former professional rugby league footballer who played for the Manly Warringah Sea Eagles in the National Rugby League.

References

External links
Manly Sea Eagles profile

1982 births
Living people
Australian rugby league players
Manly Warringah Sea Eagles players
Sunshine Coast Sea Eagles players
Rugby league props
Rugby league players from Toowoomba